Makhnyovo is an urban locality (an urban-type settlement) in Alapayevsky District of Sverdlovsk Oblast, Russia. Population:

Administrative and municipal status
Within the framework of the administrative divisions, it is, together with the work settlement of Verkhnyaya Sinyachikha and 111 rural localities, subordinated to Alapayevsky District. As a municipal division, Makhnyovo, together with thirty-nine rural localities of Alapayevsky District, is incorporated separately as Makhnyovskoye Urban Okrug. The work settlement of Verkhnyaya Sinyachikha and the other 72 rural localities are incorporated separately as Alapayevskoye Urban Okrug.

References

Notes

Sources

Urban-type settlements in Sverdlovsk Oblast
Verkhotursky Uyezd

